In mathematics, a hypocontinuous is a condition on bilinear maps of topological vector spaces that is weaker than continuity but stronger than separate continuity. Many important bilinear maps that are not continuous are, in fact, hypocontinuous.

Definition

Sufficient conditions

Theorem: Let X and Y be barreled spaces and let Z be a locally convex space. Then every separately continuous bilinear map of  into Z is hypocontinuous.

Examples

See also

References

Bibliography

 
  
  
  

Topological vector spaces
Bilinear maps